The Zimbabwe women's national under-21 field hockey team is the national women's team representing Zimbabwe in field hockey.

Tournament history

Junior World Cup

Junior Africa Hockey Cup
 1989 – 
 1993 - ?
 1997 – 
 2001 – ?
 2004 – 
 2008  – 5th
 2012 -  5th
 2016 - 
 2021 - Cancelled
 2023 –

FIH Hockey Junior World Cup Current squad

Junior Africa Hockey Cup Current squad
The squad was announced on 21 December 2022.

Head coach:  Bradley Heuer

References

Women's national under-21 field hockey teams
 
National